Lykoshino is a rural locality (a settlement) in Bologovsky District of Tver Oblast, Russia, located on the Valdayka River, northwest of the town of Bologoye (the administrative center of the district).

It has a railway station on the Moscow – Saint Petersburg Railway. On November 27, 2009, it was the closest settlement to the 2009 Nevsky Express bombing, and its residents aided in evacuating the train.

References

Rural localities in Bologovsky District
Valdaysky Uyezd